The Irish Free State (6 December 192229 December 1937) was a state established in December 1922 under the Anglo-Irish Treaty of December 1921. The treaty ended the three-year Irish War of Independence between the forces of the Irish Republic – the Irish Republican Army (IRA) – and British Crown forces.

The Free State was established as a dominion of the British Empire. It comprised 26 of the 32 counties of Ireland. Northern Ireland, which was made up of the remaining six counties, exercised its right under the Treaty to opt out of the new state. The Free State government consisted of the Governor-General – the representative of the king – and the Executive Council (cabinet), which replaced both the revolutionary Dáil Government and the Provisional Government set up under the Treaty. W. T. Cosgrave, who had led both of these administrations since August 1922, became the first President of the Executive Council (prime minister). The Oireachtas or legislature consisted of Dáil Éireann (the lower house) and Seanad Éireann (the upper house), also known as the Senate. Members of the Dáil were required to take an Oath of Allegiance to the Constitution of the Free State and to declare fidelity to the king. The oath was a key issue for opponents of the Treaty, who refused to take it and therefore did not take their seats. Pro-Treaty members, who formed Cumann na nGaedheal in 1923, held an effective majority in the Dáil from 1922 to 1927 and thereafter ruled as a minority government until 1932.

In 1931, with the passage of the Statute of Westminster, the Parliament of the United Kingdom relinquished nearly all of its remaining authority to legislate for the Free State and the other dominions. This had the effect of granting the Free State internationally recognised independence.

In the first months of the Free State, the Irish Civil War was waged between the newly established National Army and the Anti-Treaty IRA, which refused to recognise the state. The Civil War ended in victory for the government forces, with its opponents dumping their arms in May 1923. The Anti-Treaty political party, Sinn Féin, refused to take its seats in the Dáil, leaving the relatively small Labour Party as the only opposition party. In 1926, when Sinn Féin president Éamon de Valera failed to have this policy reversed, he resigned from Sinn Féin and led most of its membership into a new party, Fianna Fáil, which entered the Dáil following the 1927 general election. It formed the government after the 1932 general election, when it became the largest party.

De Valera abolished the oath of allegiance and embarked on an economic war with the UK. In 1937, he drafted a new constitution, which was adopted by a plebiscite in July of that year. The Free State came to an end with the coming into force of the new constitution on 29 December 1937, when the state took the name "Ireland".

Background
The Easter Rising of 1916 and its aftermath caused a profound shift in public opinion towards the republican cause in Ireland. In the December 1918 General Election, the republican Sinn Féin party won a large majority of the Irish seats in the British parliament: 73 of the 105 constituencies returned Sinn Féin members (25 uncontested). The elected Sinn Féin MPs, rather than take their seats at Westminster, set up their own assembly, known as Dáil Éireann (Assembly of Ireland). It affirmed the formation of an Irish Republic and passed a Declaration of Independence. The subsequent War of Independence, fought between the Irish Republican Army (IRA) and British security forces, continued until July 1921 when a truce came into force. By this time the Parliament of Northern Ireland had opened, established under the Government of Ireland Act 1920, presenting the republican movement with a fait accompli and guaranteeing the British presence in Ireland. In October negotiations opened in London between members of the British government and members of the Dáil, culminating in the signing of the Anglo-Irish Treaty on 6 December 1921.

The Treaty allowed for the creation of a separate state to be known as the Irish Free State, with dominion status, within the then British Empire—a status equivalent to Canada. The Parliament of Northern Ireland could, by presenting an address to the king, opt not to be included in the Free State, in which case a Boundary Commission would be established to determine where the boundary between them should lie. Members of the parliament of the Free State would be required to take an oath of allegiance to the king, albeit a modification of the oath taken in other dominions.

The Dáil ratified the Treaty on 7 January 1922, causing a split in the republican movement. A Provisional Government was formed, with Michael Collins as chairman.

Northern Ireland "opts out"
The Treaty, and the legislation introduced to give it legal effect, implied that Northern Ireland would be a part of the Free State on its creation. Whether the legislation had the legal effect under United Kingdom law of making Northern Ireland a part of the Irish Free State is a point legal writers have disagreed on. One writer has argued that the terms of the Treaty applied only to the 26 counties, and the government of the Free State had neither de facto nor de jure power in Northern Ireland. Another writer has argued that on the day it was established the jurisdiction of the Free State was the island of Ireland. A 1933 court decision in Ireland showed that Irish law took the latter view. The de facto position was that Northern Ireland was treated as at all times being within the United Kingdom.

The Treaty was given legal effect in the United Kingdom through the Irish Free State Constitution Act 1922. That act, which established the Free State, allowed Northern Ireland to "opt out" of it. Under Article 12 of the Treaty, Northern Ireland could exercise its option by presenting an address to the king requesting not to be part of the Irish Free State. Once the Irish Free State Constitution Act was passed on 5 December 1922, the Houses of Parliament of Northern Ireland had one month (dubbed the "Ulster month") to exercise this option during which month the Government of Ireland Act continued to apply in Northern Ireland.

Realistically it was always certain that Northern Ireland would opt out of the Free State. The Prime Minister of Northern Ireland, Sir James Craig, speaking in the Parliament in October 1922 said that "when 6 December is passed the month begins in which we will have to make the choice either to vote out or remain within the Free State". He said it was important that that choice be made as soon as possible after 6 December 1922 "in order that it may not go forth to the world that we had the slightest hesitation". On the following day, 7 December 1922, the Parliament resolved to make the following address to the king so as to opt out of the Free State:

Discussion in the Parliament of the address was short. Prime Minister Craig left for London with the memorial embodying the address on the night boat that evening, 7 December 1922. The king received it the following day, The Times reporting:

If the Parliament of Northern Ireland had not made such a declaration, under Article 14 of the Treaty Northern Ireland, its Parliament and government would have continued in being but the Oireachtas would have had jurisdiction to legislate for Northern Ireland in matters not delegated to Northern Ireland under the Government of Ireland Act. This, of course, never came to pass.

On 13 December 1922 Prime Minister Craig addressed the Parliament informing them that the king had responded to its address as follows:

Governmental and constitutional structures

The Treaty established that the new state would be a constitutional monarchy, with the Governor-General of the Irish Free State as representative of the Crown. The Constitution of the Irish Free State made more detailed provision for the state's system of government, with a three-tier parliament, called the Oireachtas, made up of the king and two houses, Dáil Éireann and Seanad Éireann (the Irish Senate).

Executive authority was vested in the king, with the Governor-General as his representative. He appointed a cabinet called the Executive Council to "aid and advise" him. The Executive Council was presided over by a prime minister called the President of the Executive Council. In practice, most of the real power was exercised by the Executive Council, as the Governor-General was almost always bound to act on the advice of the Executive Council.

Representative of the Crown

The office of Governor-General of the Irish Free State replaced the previous Lord Lieutenant, who had headed English and British administrations in Ireland since the Middle Ages. Governors-General were appointed by the king initially on the advice of the British Government, but with the consent of the Irish Government. From 1927, the Irish Government alone had the power to advise the king whom to appoint.

Oath of Allegiance
As with all dominions, provision was made for an Oath of Allegiance. Within dominions, such oaths were taken by parliamentarians personally towards the monarch. The Irish Oath of Allegiance was fundamentally different. It had two elements; the first, an oath to the Free State, as by law established, the second part a promise of fidelity, to His Majesty, King George V, his heirs and successors. That second fidelity element, however, was qualified in two ways. It was to the King in Ireland, not specifically to the King of the United Kingdom. Secondly, it was to the king explicitly in his role as part of the Treaty settlement, not in terms of pre-1922 British rule. The Oath itself came from a combination of three sources, and was largely the work of Michael Collins in the Treaty negotiations. It came in part from a draft oath suggested prior to the negotiations by President de Valera. Other sections were taken by Collins directly from the Oath of the Irish Republican Brotherhood (IRB), of which he was the secret head. In its structure, it was also partially based on the form and structure used for 'Dominion status'.

Although 'a new departure', and notably indirect in its reference to the monarchy, it was criticised by nationalists and republicans for making any reference to the Crown, the claim being that it was a direct oath to the Crown, a fact arguably incorrect by an examination of its wording, but in 1922 Ireland and beyond, many argued that the fact remained that as a dominion the King (and therefore the British) was still Head of State and that was the practical reality that influenced public debate on the issue. The Free State was not a republic. The Oath became a key issue in the resulting Irish Civil War that divided the pro and anti-treaty sides in 1922–23.

Irish Civil War

The compromises contained in the agreement caused the civil war in the 26 counties in June 1922 – April 1923, in which the pro-Treaty Provisional Government defeated the anti-Treaty Republican forces. The latter were led, nominally, by Éamon de Valera, who had resigned as President of the Republic on the treaty's ratification. His resignation outraged some of his own supporters, notably Seán T. O'Kelly, the main Sinn Féin organizer. On resigning, he then sought re-election but was defeated two days later on a vote of 60–58. The pro-Treaty Arthur Griffith followed as President of the Irish Republic. Michael Collins was chosen at a meeting of the members elected to sit in the House of Commons of Southern Ireland (a body set up under the Government of Ireland Act 1920) to become Chairman of the Provisional Government of the Irish Free State in accordance with the Treaty. The general election in June gave overwhelming support for the pro-Treaty parties. W. T. Cosgrave's Crown-appointed Provisional Government effectively subsumed Griffith's republican administration with the death of both Collins and Griffith in August 1922.

"Freedom to achieve freedom"

Governance
The following were the principal parties of government of the Free State between 1922 and 1937:
 Cumann na nGaedheal under W. T. Cosgrave (1922–32)
 Fianna Fáil under Éamon de Valera (1932–37)

Constitutional evolution

Michael Collins described the Treaty as "the freedom to achieve freedom". In practice, the Treaty offered most of the symbols and powers of independence. These included a functioning, if disputed, parliamentary democracy with its own executive, judiciary and written constitution which could be changed by the Oireachtas. Although an Irish republic had not been on offer, the Treaty still afforded Ireland more internal independence than it had possessed in over 400 years, and far more autonomy than had ever been hoped for by those who had advocated for Home Rule. 

However, a number of conditions existed:

 The king remained king in Ireland;
 Britain retained the so-called strategic Treaty Ports on Ireland's south and north-west coasts which were to remain occupied by the Royal Navy; 
 Prior to the passage of the Statute of Westminster, the UK government continued to have a role in Irish governance. Officially the representative of the king, the Governor-General also received instructions from the British Government on his use of the Royal Assent, namely a Bill passed by the Dáil and Seanad could be Granted Assent (signed into law), Withheld (not signed, pending later approval) or Denied (vetoed). The letters patent to the first Governor-General, Tim Healy, explicitly named Bills that were to be rejected if passed by the Dáil and Seanad, such as any attempt to abolish the Oath. In the event, no such Bills were ever introduced, so the issue was moot.

 As with the other dominions, the Free State had a status of association with the UK rather than being completely legally independent from it. However the meaning of 'Dominion status' changed radically during the 1920s, starting with the Chanak crisis in 1922 and quickly followed by the directly negotiated Halibut Treaty of 1923. The 1926 Imperial Conference declared the equality [including the UK] of all member states of the Commonwealth. The Conference also led to a reform of the king's title, given effect by the Royal and Parliamentary Titles Act 1927, which changed the king's royal title so that it took account of the fact that there was no longer a United Kingdom of Great Britain and Ireland. The king adopted the following style by which he would be known in all of his Empire: By the Grace of God, of Great Britain, Ireland and the British Dominions beyond the Seas King, Defender of the Faith, Emperor of India. That was the king's title in Ireland just as elsewhere in his Empire.
In the conduct of external relations, the Free State tried to push the boundaries of its status as a Dominion. It 'accepted' credentials from international ambassadors to Ireland, something no other dominion up to then had done. It registered the treaty with the League of Nations as an international document, over the objections of the United Kingdom, which saw it as a mere internal document between a dominion and the United Kingdom. Entitlement of citizenship of the Free State was defined in the Irish Free State Constitution, but the status of that citizenship was contentious. One of the first projects of the Free State was the design and production of the Great Seal of Saorstát Éireann which was carried out on behalf of the Government by Hugh Kennedy.

The Statute of Westminster of 1931, embodying a decision of an Imperial Conference, enabled each dominion to enact new legislation or to change any extant legislation, without resorting to any role for the British Parliament that may have enacted the original legislation in the past. It also removed Westminster's authority to legislate for the Dominions, except with the express request and consent of the relevant Dominion's parliament. This change had the effect of making the dominions, including the Free State, de jure independent nations—thus fulfilling Collins' vision of having "the freedom to achieve freedom".

The Free State symbolically marked these changes in two mould-breaking moves soon after winning internationally recognised independence:
 It sought, and got, the king's acceptance to have an Irish minister, to the complete exclusion of British ministers, formally advise the king in the exercise of his powers and functions as king in the Irish Free State. This gave the President of the Executive Council the right to directly advise the king in his capacity as His Majesty's Irish Prime Minister. Two examples of this are the signing of a treaty between the Irish Free State and the Portuguese Republic in 1931, and the act recognising the abdication of King Edward VIII in 1936 separately from the recognition by the British Parliament.
 The unprecedented replacement of the use of the Great Seal of the Realm and its replacement by the Great Seal of Saorstát Éireann, which the king awarded to the Irish Free State in 1931. (The Irish Seal consisted of a picture of King George V enthroned on one side, with the Irish state harp and the words Saorstát Éireann on the reverse. It is now on display in the Irish National Museum, Collins Barracks in Dublin.)

When Éamon de Valera became President of the Executive Council (prime minister) in 1932 he described Cosgrave's ministers' achievements simply. Having read the files, he told his son, Vivion, "they were magnificent, son".

The Statute of Westminster allowed de Valera, on becoming President of the Executive Council (February 1932), to go even further. With no ensuing restrictions on his policies, he abolished the Oath of Allegiance (which Cosgrave intended to do had he won the 1932 general election), the Seanad, university representation in the Dáil, and appeals to the Judicial Committee of the Privy Council.

One major policy error occurred in 1936 when he attempted to use the abdication of King Edward VIII to abolish the crown and governor-general in the Free State with the "Constitution (Amendment No. 27) Act". He was advised by senior law officers and other constitutional experts that, as the crown and governor-generalship existed separately from the constitution in a vast number of acts, charters, orders-in-council, and letters patent, they both still existed. A second bill, the "Executive Powers (Consequential Provisions) Act, 1937" was quickly introduced to repeal the necessary elements. De Valera retroactively dated the second act back to December 1936.

Currency
The new state continued to use the Pound sterling from its inception; there is no reference in the Treaty or in either of the enabling Acts to currency. Nonetheless, and within a few years, the Dáil passed the Coinage Act, 1926 (which provided for a Saorstát [Free State] coinage) and the Currency Act, 1927 (which provided inter alia for banknotes of the Saorstát pound). The new Saorstát pound was defined by the 1927 Act to have exactly the same weight and fineness of gold as was the sovereign at the time, making the new currency pegged at 1:1 with sterling. The State circulated its new national coinage in 1928, marked Saorstát Éireann and a national series of banknotes. British coinage remained acceptable in the Free State at an equal rate. In 1937, when the Free State was superseded by Ireland (Éire), the pound became known as the "Irish pound" and the coins were marked Éire.

Demographics

Birth rate 
According to one report, in 1924, shortly after the Free State's establishment, the new dominion had the "lowest birth-rate in the world". The report noted that amongst countries for which statistics were available (Ceylon, Chile, Japan, Spain, South Africa, Netherlands, Canada, Germany, Australia, United States, Britain, New Zealand, Finland and the Irish Free State), Ceylon had the highest birth rate at 40.8 per 1,000 while the Irish Free State had a birth rate of just 18.6 per 1,000.

Cultural outlook 
Irish society during this period was extremely Roman Catholic, with Roman Catholic thinkers promoting anti-capitalist, anti-communist, anti-Protestant, anti-Masonic and anti-Semitic views in Irish society. Through the works of priests such as Edward Cahill, Richard Devane and Denis Fahey, Irish society saw capitalism, individualism, communism, private banking, the promotion of alcohol, contraceptives, divorce and abortion as the pursuits of the old 'Protestant-elite' and Jews, with their efforts combined through the Freemasons. Denis Fahey described Ireland as "the third most Masonic country in the world" and saw this alleged order as contrary to the creation of an independent Irish State.

After the Irish Free State

1937 Constitution 
In 1937 the Fianna Fáil government presented a draft of an entirely new Constitution to Dáil Éireann. An amended version of the draft document was subsequently approved by the Dáil. A plebiscite was held on 1 July 1937, which was the same day as the 1937 general election, when a relatively narrow majority approved it. The new Constitution of Ireland (Bunreacht na hÉireann) repealed the 1922 Constitution, and came into effect on 29 December 1937.

The state was named Ireland (Éire in the Irish language), and a new office of President of Ireland was instituted in place of the Governor-General of the Irish Free State. The new constitution claimed jurisdiction over all of Ireland while recognising that legislation would not apply in Northern Ireland (see Articles 2 and 3). Articles 2 and 3 were reworded in 1998 to remove jurisdictional claim over the entire island and to recognise that "a united Ireland shall be brought about only by peaceful means with the consent of a majority of the people, democratically expressed, in both jurisdictions in the island".

With regard to religion, a section of Article 44 included the following:

 Following a referendum, this section was removed in 1973. After the setting up of the Free State in 1923, unionism in the south largely came to an end.

The 1937 Constitution saw a notable ideological slant to the changes of the framework of the State in such a way as to create one that appeared to be distinctly Irish. This was done so by implementing corporatist policies (based on the concepts of the Roman Catholic Church, as Catholicism was perceived to be deeply imbedded with the perception of Irish identity). A clear example of this is the model of the reconstituted Seanad Éireann (the Senate), which operates based on a system of vocational panels, along with a list of appointed nominating industry bodies, a corporatist concept (seen in Pope Pius XI's 1931 encyclical Quadragesimo anno). Furthermore, Ireland's main political parties; Fine Gael, Fianna Fáil and Labour, all had an inherently corporatist outlook. The government was the subject of intense lobbying by leading Church figures throughout the 1930s in calling for reform of the State's framework. Much of this was reflected in the new 1937 Constitution.

See also

 Irish states since 1171
 Series A Banknotes – first issued by the Irish Free State in 1928

References

Further reading
 
 
 
 
 

 
Former countries in Ireland
Irish Free State
Ireland (1922-1937)
Former countries of the interwar period
 
 
History of Ireland by period
History of the Republic of Ireland
States and territories established in 1922
States and territories disestablished in 1937
1922 establishments in Ireland
1937 disestablishments in Ireland
Modern history of the United Kingdom
Ireland and the Commonwealth of Nations
Island countries